Adiri may refer to:
 Adiri, Libya, a town in Libya
 Adiri (Titan), a region on Saturn's moon Titan
people with the name:
Jonathan Adiri (born 1982), Israeli entrepreneur
Niv Adiri, Israeli sound engineer